Fairy Springs  is a suburb of Rotorua in the Bay of Plenty Region of New Zealand's North Island. It is located south of Ngongotahā, west of Koutu, east of Selwyn Heights, and north of Mangakakahi.

A major arterial road, Fairy Springs Road, runs through the centre of the suburb. The busy road has been used for political protests. Motorists continued to use the road during severe flooding in April 2018.

Demographics

Fairy Springs had a population of 1,782 at the 2018 New Zealand census, an increase of 210 people (13.4%) since the 2013 census, and an increase of 156 people (9.6%) since the 2006 census. There were 597 households, comprising 858 males and 927 females, giving a sex ratio of 0.93 males per female. The median age was 33.3 years (compared with 37.4 years nationally), with 441 people (24.7%) aged under 15 years, 372 (20.9%) aged 15 to 29, 738 (41.4%) aged 30 to 64, and 231 (13.0%) aged 65 or older.

Ethnicities were 58.1% European/Pākehā, 51.9% Māori, 7.4% Pacific peoples, 8.2% Asian, and 1.0% other ethnicities. People may identify with more than one ethnicity.

The percentage of people born overseas was 14.0, compared with 27.1% nationally.

Although some people chose not to answer the census's question about religious affiliation, 49.3% had no religion, 34.7% were Christian, 3.5% had Māori religious beliefs, 2.0% were Hindu, 0.3% were Muslim, 0.8% were Buddhist and 1.9% had other religions.

Of those at least 15 years old, 180 (13.4%) people had a bachelor's or higher degree, and 267 (19.9%) people had no formal qualifications. The median income was $26,800, compared with $31,800 nationally. 111 people (8.3%) earned over $70,000 compared to 17.2% nationally. The employment status of those at least 15 was that 669 (49.9%) people were employed full-time, 210 (15.7%) were part-time, and 99 (7.4%) were unemployed.

References

Suburbs of Rotorua
Populated places in the Bay of Plenty Region